The Knight's Cross of the Iron Cross (German: Ritterkreuz des Eisernen Kreuzes) and its variants were the highest awards in the military of the Third Reich. Recipients are grouped by grades of the Knight's Cross. Within each grade the recipients are ordered chronologically. An exception is the lowest grade, here the recipients are ordered alphabetically by last name. The rank listed is the recipient's rank at the time the Knight's Cross was awarded. Broken out into sub lists are the recipients of the Knight's Cross with Oak Leaves, one list for every year between 1940 and 1945 the award was presented. Also listed separately are the alphabetical lists of the Knight's Cross of the Iron Cross recipients. The foreign recipients of the Knight's Cross and the foreign recipients of the Knight's Cross with Oak Leaves are listed separately as well.

The last legal presentation of the Knight's Cross, in any of its grades, had to be made before 23:01 Central European Time 8 May 1945, the time when the German surrender became effective. A number of presentations were made after this date, the last on 17 June 1945. These late presentations are considered de facto but not de jure awards. In 1986, the Association of Knight's Cross Recipients (AKCR) acknowledged 7,321 presentations made to the members of the three military branches of the Wehrmacht—the Heer (Army), Kriegsmarine (Navy) and Luftwaffe (Air Force)—as well as the Waffen-SS, the Reichsarbeitsdienst (RAD—Reich Labour Service) and the Volkssturm (German national militia). There were also 43 recipients in the military forces of allies of the Third Reich for a total of 7,364 recipients. Analysis of the German Federal Archives revealed evidence for 7,161 officially—de facto and de jure—bestowed recipients, including one additional presentation previously unidentified by the AKCR. The AKCR names 890 recipients of the Oak Leaves to the Knight's Cross, including the eight recipients who served in the military forces of allies of the Third Reich. The German Federal Archives do not substantiate 27 of these Oak Leaves recipients. The Swords to the Knight's Cross were awarded 160 times according to the AKCR, among them the posthumous presentation to the Japanese Admiral Isoroku Yamamoto, 13 of which cannot be supported by the German Federal Archives. The Diamonds to the Knight's Cross were awarded 27 times, all of which are verifiable in the German Federal Archives. The final grade, the Golden Oak Leaves to the Knight's Cross was verifiably awarded once to Hans-Ulrich Rudel on 29 December 1944.

Background
The Knight's Cross of the Iron Cross and its higher grades were based on four separate enactments. The first enactment,  of 1 September 1939 instituted the Iron Cross, the Knight's Cross of the Iron Cross and the Grand Cross of the Iron Cross. Article 2 of the enactment mandated that the award of a higher class be preceded by the award of all preceding classes. As the war progressed, some of the recipients of the Knight's Cross distinguished themselves further and a higher grade, the Oak Leaves to the Knight's Cross of the Iron Cross, was instituted. The Oak Leaves, as they were commonly referred to, were based on the enactment  of 3 June 1940. In 1941, two higher grades of the Knight's Cross were instituted. The enactment  of 28 September 1941 introduced the Knight's Cross of the Iron Cross with Oak Leaves and Swords and the Knight's Cross of the Iron Cross with Oak Leaves, Swords and Diamonds. At the end of 1944 the final grade, the Knight's Cross of the Iron Cross with Golden Oak Leaves, Swords, and Diamonds, based on the enactment  of 29 December 1944, became the final variant of the Knight's Cross authorized.

Grand Cross of the Iron Cross
The Grand Cross of the Iron Cross is based on the enactment Reichsgesetzblatt I S. 1573 of September 1, 1939 Verordnung über die Erneuerung des Eisernen Kreuzes (Regulation of the renewing of the Iron Cross). This grade was awarded only once. The sole recipient was Generalfeldmarschall Hermann Göring, who at the same time was promoted to Reichsmarschall.

Knight's Cross with Golden Oak Leaves, Swords and Diamonds
The "Knight's Cross with Golden Oak Leaves, Swords and Diamonds" is based on the enactment Reichsgesetzblatt 1945 I S. 11 of 29 December 1944. This grade of the award was to be awarded twelve times only. The sole recipient was Oberstleutnant Hans-Ulrich Rudel.

Knight's Cross with Oak Leaves, Swords and Diamonds
The "Knight's Cross with Oak Leaves, Swords and Diamonds" is based on the enactment Reichsgesetzblatt I S. 613 of 28 September 1941 to reward those servicemen who had already been awarded the Oak Leaves with Swords to the Knight's Cross of the Iron Cross. Ultimately, it would be awarded to only twenty-seven German soldiers, sailors and airmen, ranging from young fighter pilots to field marshals.

Knight's Cross with Oak Leaves and Swords

The "Knight's Cross with Oak Leaves and Swords" is also based on the enactment Reichsgesetzblatt I S. 613 of 28 September 1941 to reward those servicemen who had already been awarded the Oak Leaves to the Knight's Cross of the Iron Cross. The sequential numbers greater than 143 are unofficial and were assigned by the Association of Knight's Cross Recipients (AKCR) and therefore denoted in brackets. The number of the 160 Sword recipients is based on the analysis and acceptance of the order commission of the (AKCR). Author Veit Scherzer has challenged the validity of 13 of these listings. The majority—12 recipients—of these disputed recipients have received the award in 1945. The deteriorating situation of the Third Reich during the final days of World War II has left the nominations unfinished in various stages of the approval process. Hermann Fegelein had received the Oak Leaves in 1942 but was sentenced to death by Adolf Hitler and executed by SS-Gruppenführer Johann Rattenhuber's Reichssicherheitsdienst (RSD) on 28 April 1945 after a court martial led by SS-Brigadeführer and Generalmajor of the Waffen-SS Wilhelm Mohnke. The sentence was carried out the same day. The death sentence, according to German law, resulted in the loss of all orders and honorary signs.

Knight's Cross with Oak Leaves

The Knight's Cross with Oak Leaves was based on the enactment Reichsgesetzblatt I S. 849 of 3 June 1940. A total of 7 awards were made in 1940; 50 in 1941; 111 in 1942; 192 in 1943; 328 in 1944, and 194 in 1945, giving a total of 882 recipients—excluding the 8 foreign recipients of the Knight's Cross of the Iron Cross with Oak Leaves.

The number of 882 Oak Leaves recipients is based on the analysis and acceptance of the order commission of the Association of Knight's Cross Recipients (AKCR). Author Veit Scherzer has challenged the validity of 27 of these listings. With the exception of Hermann Fegelein, all of the disputed recipients had received the award in 1945, when the deteriorating situation of the Third Reich during the final days of World War II left the nominations unfinished in various stages of the approval process.

 List of Knight's Cross of the Iron Cross with Oak Leaves recipients (1940–1941)
 List of Knight's Cross of the Iron Cross with Oak Leaves recipients (1942)
 List of Knight's Cross of the Iron Cross with Oak Leaves recipients (1943)
 List of Knight's Cross of the Iron Cross with Oak Leaves recipients (1944)
 List of Knight's Cross of the Iron Cross with Oak Leaves recipients (1945)

Knight's Cross of the Iron Cross

The Knight's Cross of the Iron Cross is based on the enactment Reichsgesetzblatt I S. 1573 of September 1, 1939 Verordnung über die Erneuerung des Eisernen Kreuzes (Regulation of the renewing of the Iron Cross).
 List of Knight's Cross of the Iron Cross recipients (A)
 List of Knight's Cross of the Iron Cross recipients (Ba–Bm)
 List of Knight's Cross of the Iron Cross recipients (Bn–Bz)
 List of Knight's Cross of the Iron Cross recipients (C)
 List of Knight's Cross of the Iron Cross recipients (D)
 List of Knight's Cross of the Iron Cross recipients (E)
 List of Knight's Cross of the Iron Cross recipients (F)
 List of Knight's Cross of the Iron Cross recipients (G)
 List of Knight's Cross of the Iron Cross recipients (Ha–Hm)
 List of Knight's Cross of the Iron Cross recipients (Hn–Hz)
 List of Knight's Cross of the Iron Cross recipients (I)
 List of Knight's Cross of the Iron Cross recipients (J)
 List of Knight's Cross of the Iron Cross recipients (Ka–Km)
 List of Knight's Cross of the Iron Cross recipients (Kn–Kz)
 List of Knight's Cross of the Iron Cross recipients (L)
 List of Knight's Cross of the Iron Cross recipients (M)
 List of Knight's Cross of the Iron Cross recipients (N)
 List of Knight's Cross of the Iron Cross recipients (O)
 List of Knight's Cross of the Iron Cross recipients (P)
 List of Knight's Cross of the Iron Cross recipients (Q)
 List of Knight's Cross of the Iron Cross recipients (R)
 List of Knight's Cross of the Iron Cross recipients (Sa–Schr)
 List of Knight's Cross of the Iron Cross recipients (Schu–Sz)
 List of Knight's Cross of the Iron Cross recipients (T)
 List of Knight's Cross of the Iron Cross recipients (U)
 List of Knight's Cross of the Iron Cross recipients (V)
 List of Knight's Cross of the Iron Cross recipients (W)
 List of Knight's Cross of the Iron Cross recipients (X)
 List of Knight's Cross of the Iron Cross recipients (Z)

Non-existent recipients
Since the end of World War II, numerous people have claimed to be unrecognised recipients of the Knight's Cross. The majority of these "recipients" are lacking any evidence to sustain their claims and are thus denied the right to consider themselves "legal recipients". There are two cases where the legal proof of the award exists even though the recipients do not. These two "legally correct" recipients are Günther Nowak and Heinrich Scherhorn.

Günther Nowak, Hitlerjugend, was awarded the Knight's Cross on 14 February 1945 for the destruction of eleven tanks in Hindenburg, Oberschlesien. It was always assumed that he was the youngest recipient of the Knight's Cross; however, Günther Nowak never really existed — a deserting Commander of the Volkssturm named Sachs was caught and claimed that, after the retreat of the Wehrmacht, he had destroyed five tanks single-handedly. Because of this, he was taken to a Gauleiter. Fearing that his lie would be unveiled, he created the story of Günther Nowak in order to lessen his own "feat". This report was then sent to Reichsleiter Martin Bormann. Bormann immediately awarded the German Cross in Gold to the Volkssturm-Commander Sachs and the Knight's Cross to Nowak.

Foreign recipients
Foreign servicemen who did not serve in the German Wehrmacht or the Waffen-SS during World War II and were awarded the Knight's Cross of the Iron Cross or its higher grade the Knight's Cross with Oak Leaves are listed in the List of foreign recipients of the Knight's Cross of the Iron Cross.

Notes

Citations

References

External links